is a Japanese writer of mystery and science fiction light novels from the Oita Prefecture in Japan. He is a member of the Mystery Writers of Japan and the Honkaku Mystery Writers Club of Japan.

He studied the English language at Sophia University, where he graduated. In 1998 Mikumo won silver in the fifth Dengeki Novel Prize with his debut novel, Called Gehenna. He went on to win the Japan SF Rookie of the Year Award in 1999 with M.G.H., and a special prize in the Sneaker Awards in 2000 with Earth Reverse. Mikumo is currently most well known for the Asura Cryin' series and the Strike the Blood series.

Works
 Asura Cryin' series
  (xxxx), 
  (xxxx), 
  (xxxx), 
  (xxxx), 
  (xxxx), 
  (xxxx), 
  (xxxx), 
  (xxxx), 
  (xxxx), 
  (xxxx), 
  (xxxx), 
  (xxxx), 
  (xxxx), 
  (xxxx), 

 Called Gehenna series
  (xxxx), 
  (xxxx), 
  (xxxx), 
  (xxxx), 
  (xxxx), 

 Dantalian no Shoka series
  (xxxx), 
  (xxxx), 
  (xxxx), 
  (xxxx), 
  (xxxx), 
  (xxxx), 

 i.d. series
  (xxxx), 
 seven - 
  (xxxx), 

 Rebellion series
  (xxxx), 
  (xxxx), 
  (xxxx), 
  (xxxx), 
  (xxxx), 

 Strike the Blood series

 Zettai Karen Children series
  (xxxx),

Video games
 Metal Gear Solid: Portable Ops – writer
 Metal Gear Survive – writer

References

External links
 

Japanese science fiction writers
Japanese mystery writers
Light novelists
Living people
People from Ōita Prefecture
Year of birth missing (living people)